Trin-i-tee 5:7 is the debut album by American gospel group Trin-i-tee 5:7. The album spawned three singles "Oh! Mary Don't You Weep", "God's Grace", and "You Can Always Call His Name". The album became certified gold in 2000. The album debut at No. 139 Billboard 200, No. 1 on the Top Gospel, No. 2 Christian Albums, and No. 4 Heatseekers, 20 R&B charts. This was the first and only album to feature original member Terri Brown who would leave following year. In 2011, Taylor and Hayes re-recorded the remix of "God's Grace" from their Angel & Chanelle album with the original versions to the song. R. Kelly wrote the single "God's Grace".

Track listing
 "I Won't Turn Back"
 "God's Grace"
 "You Can Always Call His Name"
 "Oh! Mary Don't You Weep"
 "Saved Boy (Interlude)"
 "Pray for Awhile"
 "Good for Me"
 "God's Blessing"
 "Sunshine"
 "With All My Heart"
 "Respect Yourself"
 "Holy & Righteous"
 "Call His Name"
 "Trin-i-tee (Interlude)"

Charts

Weekly charts

Year-end charts

References

Trin-i-tee 5:7 albums
1998 debut albums